Brian Edward Benben (born June 18, 1956) is an American actor, best known for his role as Martin Tupper in the HBO comedy television series Dream On (1990–1996), and also known as Sheldon Wallace on ABC medical drama Private Practice (2008–2013), and as Larry in ‘’I Come in Peace’’ (1990).

Early life and career
Benben was born in Winchester, Virginia, the son of Gloria Patricia (née Coffman) and Peter Michael Benben Sr., a produce buyer.

He later lived and attended high school in Marlboro, New York, followed by two years at Ulster County Community College in Stone Ridge, New York, after which he moved to New York City, where he worked various jobs while auditioning and acting. In 1983 he appeared in the Broadway production of John Byrne's play Slab Boys with Kevin Bacon, Sean Penn, Val Kilmer and Jackie Earle Haley. The play ran on Broadway for 48 performances.

Although his first national exposure was in the 1981 NBC miniseries-then-series The Gangster Chronicles, Benben is perhaps best known for his leading role in the 1990–96 HBO television series, Dream On. He played a "by the book" FBI agent in the 1990 film Dark Angel (known in the U.S. as I Come in Peace).

He had a starring role in the 1994, film Radioland Murders playing Mary Stuart Masterson's estranged husband. In September 1998, he starred in an eponymous primetime CBS sitcom, The Brian Benben Show, which lasted only one month on the air. In the 2000s, he played Dr. Sheldon Wallace on Shonda Rhimes' Private Practice. His character was first introduced in December 2008, later became a recurring character, and finally a series regular. In 2014, he appeared in the television series Scandal, also produced by Rhimes.

Personal life
In 1982, Benben married actress Madeleine Stowe, whom he met filming The Gangster Chronicles. Together they have one child, daughter May Theodora Benben (born 1996). Benben and Stowe live west of Austin, near Johnson City, Texas.

Filmography

References

External links

1956 births
American male stage actors
American male television actors
Living people
People from Marlboro, New York
People from Winchester, Virginia
Male actors from Virginia
Male actors from New York (state)
20th-century American male actors
21st-century American male actors